The Pacific Cup was a rugby league football competition for national teams from the Pacific region.

History
The Pacific Cup was started in 1975 by Keith Gittoes of the New South Wales Rugby League. It was held twice in the 1970s before being abandoned due to cost.

The competition was revived in 1986 by Peter Donnelly. This was a true Pacific Cup with Polynesian players playing for their true country of origin rather than for the NZ Maoris as had previously been the case . The competition was held biennially until the 1996 competition was postponed. Instead a 1996 Pacific Challenge was held. The Super League ran an Oceania Cup in 1997.

The Pacific Cup was revived by the New Zealand Rugby League once again in 2004, this time as a secondary competition to the Pacific Rim Championship. It was again held in February and March 2006 under NZRL administration, this time as a main competition.

In the post-2008 Rugby League World Cup shake up of the international calendar by the RLIF, it was confirmed that a Pacific Cup was to be held in 2009 with the winner of the tournament entering the 2010 Four Nations tournament.

The 2009 tournament was hosted by Papua New Guinea. The competing teams were Cook Islands, Fiji, Papua New Guinea, Samoa and Tonga.

Appearances
Eighteen teams from ten nations have taken part in the 12 Pacific Cup tournaments held to date:
  – 11 appearances
  – 10 appearances
  – 9 appearances
  – 7 appearances
  – 7 appearances
  – 6 appearances
  – 5 appearances (1986, 1988, 1990, 1992, 2006)
  – 5 appearances (1986, 1990, 1992, 1994, 2004)
  – 3 appearances (1988, 1992, 1994)
  Australian Aborigines – 3 appearances (1990, 1992, 1994)
  New Zealand XIII – 2 appearances (1996, 1997)
  – 2 appearances (1975, 1977)
  – 2 appearances (1975, 1977)
  – 1 appearance (1994)
  Rotuma – 1 appearance (1994)
  – 1 appearance (1992)
  – 1 appearance (1990)
  – 1 appearance (1977)

Finals

Results

See also

Pacific Rugby League International

References

External links

 
Rugby league international tournaments
Oceanian rugby league competitions